Nurses Song with Elephants is the debut solo album of David Bedford. It was released in 1972 by Dandelion Records. It features Mike Oldfield, Kevin Ayers and composer Gilbert Biberian.

Track listing
All tracks composed by David Bedford.
"It's Easier Than It Looks"
"Nurses Song with Elephants" (words by William Blake)
"Some Bright Stars for Queens College"
"Trona"
"Sad and Lonely Faces" (words by Kenneth Patchen)

Personnel
David Bedford – recorder, melodica, piano
Mike Oldfield – bass guitar on "Nurses Song with Elephants"
The Omega Players – guitar on "Nurses Song with Elephants"
Gilbert Biberian – conductor ("Nurses Song with Elephants")
The Queens College Girls Choir – vocals on "Some Bright Stars for Queens College"
Sebastian Bell Ensemble ("Trona")
Kevin Ayers – vocals on "Sad and Lonely Faces"

References

1972 debut albums
Dandelion Records albums